Mano Po Legacy: Her Big Boss is a 2022 Philippine television drama romantic comedy series broadcast by GMA Network. The series is the second installment of Mano Po Legacy. Directed by Easy Ferrer and Joey de Guzman, it stars Bianca Umali, Ken Chan and Kelvin Miranda. It premiered on March 14, 2022 on the network's Telebabad line up. The series concluded on June 2, 2022 with a total of 50 episodes. It was replaced by Love You Stranger in its timeslot.

Cast and characters
Lead cast
 Bianca Umali as Irene Pacheco
 Ken Chan as Richard Lim
 Kelvin Miranda as Nestor Lorenzo

Supporting cast
 Pokwang as Rebecca "Becca" Pacheco
 Arlene Muhlach as Adelina "Adeng" Pacheco
 Ricardo Cepeda as Alexander "Alex" Lim
 Marina Benipayo as Elaine Dy-Lim
 Teejay Marquez as Raven Lim
 Tyrone Tan as David G. Tan
 Blue Cailles as Lemuel "Lem" Carrera
 Sarah Holmes as Rachel Lim
 Sarah Edwards as Princess Grace Que
 Haley Dizon as Charlene Ang
 Jem Manicad as "Solenn" Baluyot
 Phi Palmos as "April" Ligot

Recurring cast
 Maricar de Mesa as Mia Flores
 Minnie Aguilar as Natalia Lorenzo
 Lime Aranya as Marla Pacheco
 Julian Roxas as Nimrod Layco
 Peewee O' Hara as Noemi Capistrano
 Lotlot Bustamante as Mylene Bautista
 Donna Cariaga as Guia Sugcang
 Rob Gomez as Joseph Chan
 Rolando Innocencio as Froilan Andrade
 Shermaine Santiago as Elise Ty
 Francis Mata as Atty. Ronaldo Sy
 Che Ramos as Millicent Rodrigo
 Christian Ty as Elmer
 Paul Cervantes as Martin
 Shanicka Arganda as Hannah
 Yesh Burce as Sophia Wong

Episodes

References

External links
 
 

2022 Philippine television series debuts
2022 Philippine television series endings
Filipino-language television shows
GMA Network drama series
Philippine romance television series
Live action television shows based on films
Television shows set in the Philippines